Royal High School Bath is an independent day and boarding school for girls and in the city of Bath, Somerset, England, catering for up to 650 pupils and part of the Girls' Day School Trust. The school is on Lansdown Road, just outside Bath city centre, and has boarding facilities for about 150 girls.

History

Bath High School for Girls
Bath High School for Girls was founded in 1875 by the Girls' Public Day School Company, now the Girls' Day School Trust. It was a direct grant grammar school from 1946 until 1976.

Royal School

Merger
Royal High School Bath was formed by the merger in 1998 of Bath High School (day) and the Royal School (day and boarding).
As a result, it is the only member of the Girls' Day School Trust to provide boarding accommodation.
Today, the Prep School has Cranwell House as its main building, whereas the Senior School has the main school building and the Winfield centre for sixth form students – both on Lansdown Road.

Prep School

Girls can start in the Nursery School one and a half months before they are three years old. The Prep School will take pupils in the September after their fourth birthday. The Prep School has around 200 full-time pupils from Reception to Year 6, and around 20 part-time pupils in the Nursery.

The Prep School is in Cranwell House, in Weston Park, near to the Senior School.

Senior School
The senior school is on Lansdown Road near Bath city centre.

The main building was built in 1856-8 by James Wilson and is a Grade II listed building. There is an Art School; a Sixth Form café; a fitness suite, a separate Sixth Form building and newly refurbished boarding houses; two Performing Arts Theatres (The Sophie Cameron Performing Arts Centre and The Memorial Hall); The Hudson Centre for lectures and meetings; a sports hall complex, netball and tennis courts, an astroturf; a library, a Media Centre, and a new music school and state of the art recording studio.
The boarding houses are situated in Lansdown Road. The Senior school has a medical centre.

Academic performance
It regularly comes near the top of league tables for Bath schools for GCSE and A-Level results. The school provides Modern Languages including GCSE French, which girls start to learn in reception class. German, Spanish, Italian, Mandarin, Arabic, and Japanese are also available. The school also provides the IB Programme, where it had an average score of 37 points in 2019 with nearly half the cohort achieving 40+ points.

Arts
The art school was opened by Professor Sir Christopher Frayling – Rector of the Royal College of Art and Chairman of the Arts Council, England – in November 2008. There are four studios for activities such as painting, sculpture, printmaking, film and photography. In 2006 it received an award from the 'Good Schools Guide' for gaining the best A level results in the country over a three-year period. Degree choices vary from Fine Art and Fashion through to Architecture and Photography.

The building was designed by Textus architectural practice to replicate other professional art schools, like the Royal Academy Schools and the Prince's Drawing School, which can be transformed from working studios into exhibition spaces. There are well-lit studio spaces for drawing, painting, printmaking, photography, and three-dimensional work.

In 2011 a History of Art A-level began to be offered.

Music
The Music Department (Steinway School Status from January 2020) is housed in a purpose-built Music School and consists of a 60-seat Recital Room with a Model B Steinway grand piano, state of the art, soundproofed recording studios with two Model AS Steinway grand pianos, 10 soundproofed practice rooms each containing upright Steinway pianos, Apple Mac suite, main teaching room, Green Room, reception area, offices and instrument storage facilities.

Ensembles consist of Vocalise (Year 7–9 choir), V20 (Show and Pop choir), Chamber Choir, The Sixth Sense (6th Form Choir), Orchestra, Concert Band, Jazz Band, Brass Ensemble, Sax Ensemble, Percussion Ensemble and Pop & Rock Bands.

The department produces 35-40 concerts during the academic year, both internally and externally, and a whole-school production every Summer Term. International tours take place every two years and there are opportunities for all students to learn any musical instrument, provided by professional visiting instrumental staff.

As part of the department's Steinway Music School status, there is a regular programme of masterclasses and recitals led by leading artists who work closely with the students.

Drama
The Drama department has use of the school's two performance venues; the Memorial Hall is a traditional 'end on' performance space and has movable raked seating, the Sophie Cameron Performing Arts is a converted chapel with almost limitless performance possibilities.  There is an annual Summer musical, open to all students. Previous productions include, 'Guys & Dolls', 'Annie', 'Oliver!' and 'Stepping Out'.

There is an annual Lower School play for students in Years 7–8 and an upper school play open to Year 9 and upwards. Previous KS3 productions include, 'Cold Comfort Farm', 'Pride & Prejudice', 'The Wind in the Willows', 'A Midsummer Night's Dream', and at KS4; 'The Crucible', 'Antigone', and 'Numbers'.  The Year 13 Theatre Studies students run the weekly Year 7 Drama Club and the drama scholars regularly produce their own evening of performances throughout the school year.  Students can participate in Speech & Drama lessons, and the school also participates in the National Theatre Connections Festival biannually.
Students at the Prep school put on plays too.

PE and sports
The sports facilities at Royal High School Bath are situated on its Lansdown site. Girls play a wide range of sports with elite performers in equestrian, gymnastics, swimming, netball, biathlon, fencing, and martial arts. Royal High School competes with a range of state and independent schools, participates in national leagues and competitions, and accesses high-performance facilities at the University of Bath Olympic Sports Training Village.

On-site facilities include:
 All-weather Astroturf for hockey
 Tennis courts
 Netball courts
 Outdoor swimming pool
 Football field
 Rounders pitches
 Indoor sports hall
 Gym suite
 Dance studio
 Gymnastic equipment
 Cricket pitches
 Off-site, an equestrian team trains at local equestrian centres.

Sporting achievements within the school are awarded by the presentation of "Colours" annually for commitment to clubs and extra-curricular activities.

Houses 
There are four houses across both the Prep and Senior School:

 Brontë

 Du Pré 

 Wollstonecraft

 Austen

Notable alumni

Royal School
 Mary Duggan, cricketer
 Sheila Gish, actress
 Gillian Howell (1927–2000), architect
 June Lloyd, Baroness Lloyd of Highbury, Nuffield Professor of Child Health from 1985 to 1992 at the British Postgraduate Medical Federation, Professor of Child Health from 1975 to 1985 at St George's Hospital Medical School, and President from 1988 to 1991 of the British Paediatric Association
 Myrtle Maclagan, cricketer
 Iris Morley, historian
 Edith Picton-Turbervill OBE, Labour MP from 1929 to 1931 for The Wrekin
 Susan Strange, economist
 Cecil Woodham-Smith (née Fitzgerald), historian
 Sonia Melchett (née Graham), socialite and writer
 Penny Mountbatten, Lady Ivar Mountbatten, businesswoman and philanthropist

Bath High School
 Dawn Austwick OBE, chief executive of the Esmée Fairbairn Foundation, and CEO of the Big Lottery Fund
 Mary Berry, food writer
 Jennie Formby, senior official in the Unite trade union and General Secretary of the Labour Party
 Elspeth Howe, Baroness Howe of Idlicote CBE, wife of Geoffrey Howe, and chair 1997–9 of the Broadcasting Standards Commission
 Joan Heal Actress
 Dr Cicely Williams CMG, advisor in Maternal and Child Health, pioneer in the treatment of kwashiorkor, and the first Head of the maternal and child health section at the World Health Organization
Bunny Guinness, landscape designer

References

External links
 
 Profile on the Independent Schools Council website

Girls' schools in Somerset
Boarding schools in Somerset
Educational institutions established in 1998
Private schools in Bath and North East Somerset
Schools of the Girls' Day School Trust
Member schools of the Girls' Schools Association
1998 establishments in England
Schools in Bath, Somerset